ZG Mobili was an Italian cycling team that existed from 1991 to 1997.

Notable riders
 Massimo Ghirotto
 Gianni Faresin
 Stefano Colagè 
 Hendrik Redant 
 Fabiano Fontanelli
 Fabio Casartelli 
 Andrea Ferrigato 
 Maurizio Fondriest 
 Alexander Gontchenkov 
 Paolo Savoldelli 
 Dimitri Konyshev 
 Giancarlo Perini 
 Piotr Ugrumov 
 Viatcheslav Djavanian
 Dimitri Sedun
 Youri Sourkov
 Nelson Rodríguez

References

External links

Defunct cycling teams based in Italy
Cycling teams based in Italy
Cycling teams established in 1991
Cycling teams disestablished in 1997
1991 establishments in Italy
1997 disestablishments in Italy